Dennis Kennedy may refer to:

 D. James Kennedy (1930–2007), American pastor, evangelist, and Christian broadcaster
 Dennis Kennedy (author) (born 1940), American author of books on theater and performance
 Dennis Campbell Kennedy (born 1930), writer on Irish and European affairs